Claytonia megarhiza is a species of wildflower in the family Montiaceae known by the common names fell-fields claytonia and alpine springbeauty. The specific epithet megarhiza is Greek for "large roots".

Range and Habitat
Claytonia megarhiza is native to western North America from northwestern Canada to New Mexico, where it grows in rock crevices and talus habitats in subalpine and alpine climates. The species is known from summits and slopes of North America's highest mountains including the Redstone Mountains of the Canadian Northwest Territories, disjunct south to the central and southern Rocky Mountains reaching a southern limit in the Sangre de Cristo Mountains. In the Wenatchee Mountains of Washington State it is often found on serpentine.

Description
This is a perennial herb growing from a thick, scaly caudex topped with a stem  in length. The fleshy basal leaves form a dense rosette around the caudex. The leaves are often red when young and turn green as they mature, often retaining a dark purple-red edge. The inflorescences arise from within the rosette of leaves, usually around the rosette edges, and produce a dense cluster of two to six white or pinkish flowers. Each petals reaches  in length. Claytonia megarhiza var. nivalis (Wenatchee springbeauty) grows on serpentine soils and has bright violet flowers.

Uses
The rosettes of the leaves and the roots can be eaten as an emergency food.

References

External links

Photo gallery at CalPhotos

megarhiza
Plants described in 1862
Flora of North America